Harlansburg is an unincorporated community in Polk Township, Huntington County, Indiana, United States.

History
Harlansburg (also historically Harlansburgh) once had a sawmill and its own post office. The post office operated from 1879 until 1903.

Geography

References

Unincorporated communities in Huntington County, Indiana
Unincorporated communities in Indiana